Fernando Pérez Valdés (born 1944) is a prominent Cuban film director.

Career 
Pérez graduated from the University of Havana with a degree in Language and Spanish Literature, and began working in the Cuban film industry in 1971 as an assistant director, before directing his first documentary in 1975.

His feature debut was the drama Clandestinos (1987) but it was not until Madagascar (1994) that he garnered significant international recognition. Pérez later directed La Vida es Silbar (1998) and Suite Habana (2003).  Suite Habana is considered by some critics to be the best Cuban film in decades. Variety hailed it as "A lyrical, meticulously-crafted and unexpectedly melancholy homage to the battered but resilient inhabitants of a battered but resilient city." His most recent film called Madrigal tells a story about life in the theater world. His next film was biopic that cover the childhood and early teenage years of Cuban national hero Jose Marti entitled Marti: El ojo del Canario, which premiered in 2010 and earned several awards in the film Festival Circuit. In recent years he completed La Pared de las Palabras (2014), Ultimos Dias en la Habana (2016) and Insumisa (2018).

In the spring term 2016 Pérez was the fifth Friedrich Dürrenmatt Guest Professor for World Literature at the University of Bern.

References

External links
 Full Filmography and awards list at ICAIC's (Cuban Film Industry) Official Website
 

Cuban film directors
Living people
1944 births
University of Havana alumni